The Danish order of precedence is a symbolic hierarchy of Danish officials used to direct protocol. It has no official status and entails no special privileges, but has been established in practical use, e.g. determining seating arrangements at formal occasions in the royal house. The order of precedence is very elaborate, and especially the lower classes include many relatively obscure civil servant positions; the following is only an excerpt.

The royal family 
Members of the royal family are not part of the official order of precedence, but are traditionally placed on top of the hierarchy. Their order is as follows:
 The Queen
 The Crown Prince
 The Crown Princess
 Prince Christian
 Princess Isabella
 Prince Vincent
 Princess Josephine
 Prince Joachim
 Princess Marie
 Count Nikolai
 Count Felix
 Count Henrik
 Countess Athena
 Princess Benedikte

When the Queen is out of the country or otherwise unable to perform her duties, the heir apparent becomes regent. If the heir apparent is also out of the country or otherwise not able of being regent, one of three people, whom the Queen has chosen, can become 'rigsforstander'. These people are:
Prince Joachim of Denmark
Princess Benedikte of Denmark
Crown Princess Mary of Denmark

The order of precedence 
The 1st Class is the highest, and 5th Class is the lowest. Classes 1 and 2 are exhaustively listed here by the most recent officially published ranking, while classes 3–5 are summarized and only an excerpt. Within the individual classes themselves there are also secondary orders of precedence, shown here with the numbers.

Statutory basis 
The Danish order of precedence is decided by royal regulation, which was first published in 1671. The current ranking is from 1746 – The Royal Regulation of 14 October 1746. Throughout time, there have been multiple revisions and changes to the order of precedence, the most recent being on 16 December 1971.

1st Class 

 Counts of Rosenborg and the Countess of Frederiksborg
 --
 The Queen's Chief Court Mistress (none since 1952)
 The Prime Minister and the other Government ministers. The Queen's Maid of the Bedchamber. The Princesses' ladies-in-waiting.
 The President of the Supreme Court
 Knights of the Elephant
 Grand Commanders of the Dannebrog.
 The Lord Chamberlain of Denmark (not in current use).
 Generals and admirals (the Chief of Defence is the only military officer of this rank in Denmark at any given time)
 The Chancellor of the Order. Lord Marshal of the Court. Lieutenant generals and vice admirals
 Lord Groom of the Chamber.
 Lord Master of the Horse. Lord Master of the Royal Hunt. Lord Master of Ceremonies. Lord Pourer.
 Counts Danneskiold-Samsøe, and their male descendants. The Mother Superior for the noble Diocese of Vallø.

2nd Class 

 Grand Crosses of the Dannebrog
 Counts. Ambassadors. The Court Marshal of Denmark. The male descendants of the Counts of Rosenborg. The private secretary to the Queen. The female descendants of the Counts (and Lensgrever) Danneskiold-Samsøe, both the unmarried and married, rank in the 2nd class No. 2. The Comtesses of Rosenborg. Extraordinary and authorized ambassadors in salary bracket 40.
 The Queen's Chief of Staff
 The Royal Family's court marshals and chief of staffs, according to seniority. The eldest son of a Lensgreve, when they are the chamberlains. The Queen's ladies-in-waiting. The Princesses' maids of honour. The 3 female court members of the noble Diocese of Vallø.
 Chamberlains. The Captain of the Royal Yacht. The Chief of the Queen's aides-de-camp. Supreme Court judges. Presidents of the High courts. The Permanent Secretaries. The Director of the Ministry of Foreign Affairs. The Director-general of the Danish Railways. The Postmaster General. Major generals and rear admirals. The Attorney General. The National Police Commissioner. The Lord Mayor of Copenhagen. The Managing Director of the National Bank of Denmark. Bishops in the Church of Denmark. The Rector of the University of Copenhagen. The Royal Danish high commissioner in Greenland. The Customs Director. The High Commissioner of the Faeroe Islands. The Surgeon general. The Judge Advocate General. The Chief Public Prosecutor. The Director General of the National Board of Health. The Prioress of Vemmetofte Convent. The 35 ladies-beneficiary of the noble Diocese of Vallø.
 The Master of the Horse
 The Master of the Royal Hunt. The Master of Ceremonies.
 --
 --
 --
 The Royal Konfessionarius (equivalent to Chaplain-in-Ordinary).
 Junior ministry secretaries. Consuls general. University rectors. The Bishop of the Faroe Islands

3rd Class 

 Barons
 High Court judges. Colonels and naval captains. Directors at Rigshospitalet. Regents Professor at the University of Copenhagen. Rectors of Business schools and Dental schools. Managing Directors of the National Museum of Denmark, the Danish National Archive and the Royal Danish Theatre. The Master of the Royal Mint
 The High Court judge of Greenland
 County Court judges. Lieutenant colonels and commanders. Chief Constables. Senior hospital physicians. Provosts in the Church of Denmark. University Professors. Gymnasium rectors

4th Class 

 Chief inspectors. Majors and Lieutenant Commanders. Senior vicars
 Managing directors at the regional archives. University associate professors.

5th Class 

 Gymnasium associate professors. University assistant professors.
 Police inspectors. Junior vicars
 Captains and naval lieutenants.
 Lieutenants and naval lieutenants, junior grade

Notes

References 

Orders of precedence
Order of precedence
Order of precedence